"White Cross on Okinawa" is 1945 song by Bob Wills and His Texas Playboys.  The song was Bob Wills' fourth number one on the Juke Box Folk chart where it spent a single week at the top and a total of five weeks on the chart.

References
 

1945 songs
American patriotic songs
Bob Wills songs
Songs about Japan
Songs of World War II
Song articles with missing songwriters
Japan in non-Japanese culture
Columbia Records singles